Hystrichophora taleana, the indigobush twig borer, is a moth of the family Tortricidae. It is known from the United States where it was found in Washington and Sharkey counties in Mississippi and Chico County in southeastern Arkansas.

The wingspan is 13–17 mm. Adults are grayish brown. There may be more than one generation per year.

The larvae feed on indigobush. They feed on the shoots of their host plant and make short tunnels in twigs and terminals. Pupation takes place in burrows.

References

Enarmoniini
Moths described in 1878